Lucy Neale (also known as Lucy O'Day) is an American-German artist, notable for being one of the vocalists of the 1970s Silver Convention disco group.

Life and career
Neale was born January 24, 1948, in Cleveland, Ohio. After graduating college, Neale traveled to Munich, West Germany to play part in the musical Hair. She later released her first single in Germany, "Nur Beim Träumen ( Sad Sweet Dreamer) / Komm Heim Zu Mir". Later that year in 1974, she was hired by Michael Kunze and Sylvester Levay to take part in the studio recording of Silver Convention as a vocalist. A year later, she joined the Love Generation group. During the 1970s, she provided backing vocals for several well-known artists, such as Donna Summer and Penny McLean. In 1980, she co-founded The Hornettes group along with former Silver Convention band member, Gitta Walther. Neale left Germany in 1985 and moved back to the United States to pursue her musical career there. She currently lives in San Diego, California, and is a member of girl group Moxie.

References

1948 births
20th-century American singers
American disco musicians
American women singer-songwriters
German-language singers
Singer-songwriters from Ohio
Musicians from Cleveland
American disco singers
American expatriate musicians
Living people
20th-century American women singers
21st-century American women
Silver Convention members